Charlie Hunter or C S Hunter was a trainer and driver of standardbred racehorses in New Zealand. 

He was associated with the champion pacer Young Quinn. 

Hunter topped the New Zealand trainer's list in the 1967/68 and 1973/74 seasons, and was first equal in the 1974/75 season.

He also drove winners such as:

 French Pass, winner of the 1967 Dominion Handicap
 Min Scott, winner of the 1963 Dominion Handicap
 Scottish Warrior, winner of the 1972 New Zealand Messenger Championship

References

See also
 Harness racing in New Zealand

New Zealand harness racers
 New Zealand racehorse trainers